Feiyufu, also called feiyu mangyi, is a type of traditional Han Chinese clothing which first appeared in the Ming dynasty. It is also specific name which generally refers to a robe (generally tieli) decorated with the patterns of flying fish (although the flying fish is not the flying fish defined in the dictionary). The feiyufu worn by the Ming dynasty imperial guards reappeared in the 21st century following the hanfu movement and is worn by Hanfu enthusiasts of both genders.

embroidery design 
The flying fish decoration looks very similar to the python (mang) pattern on the mangfu, but was actually a dragon-like creature with wings and the fanned tail of a fish. The flying fish also had 4 claws like the mang, a dragon head and a carp's body and two horns.

The early flying fish ornament were characterized by the presence of double wings while in the middle and late Ming dynasty, the flying fish could only be distinguished from the python pattern by the presence of its fish tail instead of a dragon tail.

Construction and design 
The feiyufu is typically in the form of tieli (a robe with a y-shaped cross collar, with either broad or narrow sleeves and pleats below the waist) decorated with the feiyu pattern.

History

Ming dynasty 
The tieli originated in the Yuan dynasty in a form of Mongol robe known as terlig. Despite the repeated prohibition of Mongol-style clothing, especially during the reign of the Hongwu Emperor, some Mongol clothing from the Yuan dynasty remained. After being adopted in the Ming dynasty, the tieli became longer and its overall structure was made closer to the shenyi system in order to integrate Han Chinese rituals.

The feiyufu appeared in the Ming dynasty and was unique to the Ming dynasty. It is a form of tieli decorated with flying fish patterns. The feiyfu was also a type of cifu, a form of clothing which can only be bestowed by the Chinese emperors to those whom he favoured, and were only second to the mangfu.

List of people bestowed with feiyufu 
In the Ming dynasty, the feiyufu could be worn by a handful of civil officials, military officers, and chief eunuchs:

 Under the rule of the Yongle Emperor (r. 1402 –1424 AD), the eunuchs were allowed feiyufu when they would serve the emperor.
 In 1447 AD during the reign of the Zhengtong Emperor, the Ministry of Works issued an edict which would put artisans to death and send artisan's families to frontier garrisons as soldiers should the artisan produce feiyufu among other prohibited clothing for commoners. The edict was issued to stop the transgressing of dress regulations.
 Emperor Zhengde (r. 1505 – 1521 AD) bestowed a feiyufu to Song Suqing, a Japanese envoy, in an unprecedented act.
 Shen Defu (1578 –1642 AD) also noted the emperor would could bestow a red feiyufu to a guard which was promoted to court guard. He also wrote in "the beginnings of the bestowals of dragon robes to Grand Secretaries" that the feiyufu was bestowed to the six ministers, the grand marshals with the mission to inspect troops, and to the eunuchs who were servicing in the houses of princes.

In popular culture 
The feiyufu and feiyufu-style guzhuang are depicted in Chinese television drama, especially period drama set in the Ming dynasty such as:

 Flying Swords of Dragon Gate (2011)
 Under the Power (2019)
 The Sleuth of the Ming Dynasty (2020)
 Royal feast (2022)

Similar clothing 

Douniufu
Mangfu
Jisün
 terlig
 Yesa

See also 

 Hanfu
 List of Hanfu
 Chinese ornamental gold silk

References 

Chinese traditional clothing